Nd:YAB (Yttrium aluminum borate, YAl3(BO3)4, hereafter referred to as YAB), is grown by the flux method with a modified molybdate flux system. And it provides the possibility of realizing diode-pumped visible lasers by self-frequency-doubling (SFD) the main infrared Laser Radiation lines.

References

Borates
Aluminium compounds
Yttrium compounds
Self-frequency-doubling materials
Crystals
Laser gain media